Dypsis canescens, also known as Chrysalidocarpus canescens, is a species of flowering plant in the family Arecaceae. It is endemic to the Sambirano region of northwestern Madagascar. It was identified in 1913. It is probably extinct, given that it has not been seen for half a century.

References

canescens
Endemic flora of Madagascar
Critically endangered plants
Taxonomy articles created by Polbot
Taxa named by Henri Lucien Jumelle
Taxa named by Joseph Marie Henry Alfred Perrier de la Bâthie